Ardeşen GSK is a women's handball club from Ardeşen in Rize Province playing in the Turkish Super League. Founded in 2008, the team play their home matches in the Ardeşen RTEÜ MYO Hall. Club chairman is Sultan Rauf Oğuz. The team is managed by Hikmet Vurgun. The team is nicknamed "Dişi Atmacalar" ("Female Hawks").

Club colors and logo
The club's colors are maroon and white.

The logo of the club is composed of a maroon-colored circle with the club's title and foundation year on it in white, which frames a hawk head and the club's initials both resembling a powerful handball shoot.

Competitions

Domestic
The team played in the Turkish Women's Handball League from 2008 until their promotion to the Turkish Women's Handball Super League in the 2012–13 season. In the 2013–14 season, they finished the league at third place. Ardeşen GSK ranked fourth in the 2014–15 league losing in the play-off to Kastamonu Bld. GSK.

International
Ardeşen GSK played in the 2013–14 Women's EHF Challenge Cup and advanced to the quarterfinals, however they were defeated by the Swedish team H 65 Höör. They failed to advance to the semifinals in the 2014–15 Women's EHF Challenge Cup losing to the Polish team Pogoń Baltica Szczecin by 57–59. The team lost to the Russian HC Lada Togliatti by 50–80 in the last 16 of 2015–16 Women's EHF Cup Winners' Cup's knock-out stage.

European record

Squad
As of July 2019

Goalkeepers
  Kristina Graovac
  Halime Beykurt

Wings
  Duygu Özakaydin

  Marija Mugosa
Pivots
  Esra Ertap
  Neslihan Akcanca
  Ilayda Gürsoy

Backs
  Perihan Topaloğlu
  Kübra Yılmaz
  Cigdem Demirbas
  Gamze Hasimoglu

Notable former players
  Aslı İskit (born 1993)
  Sandra Nikčević (born 1984)
  Fatmagül Sakızcan (born 1992)

Honours
Turkish Women's Handball Super League
 Third place (1): 2013–14

References

 
2008 establishments in Turkey
Handball clubs established in 2008
Women's handball clubs
Turkish handball clubs